Stellan Brynell (born September 28, 1962) is a chess grandmaster from Sweden. He became Swedish champion in 1991 and in 2005. He represents the Swedish club Limhamns SK.

Team events
He represented Sweden in the Chess Olympiads of 1992, 1998, 2000, 2002 and 2004. He also participated at the European Team Chess Championships of 1989, 1999, 2001, 2003 and 2005.

References
Olimpbase - Olympiads and other Team event information

External links
Brynell's games at Chessgames.com

1962 births
Living people
Chess grandmasters
Swedish chess players
Chess Olympiad competitors